Purani Basti in Raipur, Chhattisgarh was one of the oldest known civilizations of modern India. Purani basti in Hindi means "old colony" and was one of the richest cultural bases of central India. It had many museums and ancient buildings which were a symbol of Stone Age.

It had a modern market, malls, stadiums, race course, gyms, sports clubs in the near surrounding areas of 2 km radius. it was a hub of auto-expos and business fairs.

"Turi hatri" was the first commercial fruit/vegetable market known as the parent of barter system of exchange.
The first underground Museum of the world was built there.

Sport
The term hand of God was given to Diego Maradona's goal after he visited Purani basti immediately after the FIFA World Cup victory of Argentina in 1986 to free himself from the guilt. Thereafter many sports person visited to confessions. The famous game called "nadi pahad" was claimed to have been invented there.

Ancient Indian cities